Bayer 04 Leverkusen Fußball GmbH, also known as Bayer 04 Leverkusen, Bayer Leverkusen, or simply Leverkusen, is a  professional football club based in Leverkusen, North Rhine-Westphalia, Germany. The club competes in the Bundesliga, the top tier of German football, and plays its home matches at the BayArena.

The club was founded in 1904 by employees of the German pharmaceutical company Bayer AG, whose headquarters are in Leverkusen and from which the club draws its name. It was formerly the best-known department of TSV Bayer 04 Leverkusen, a sports club whose members also participate in athletics, gymnastics, basketball, field handball and other sports including the RTHC Bayer Leverkusen (rowing, tennis and hockey). In 1999, the football department was separated from the sports club and is now a separate entity formally called Bayer 04 Leverkusen Fußball GmbH. Bayer were first promoted to the Bundesliga in 1979, and have remained in the top division ever since. The club's main colours are red and black, both having been used as the main shirt colour and with red and black stripes also having been used as home colours.

Bayer Leverkusen have finished as runner-up in the Bundesliga five times without winning the competition, a record in German football. The club has won one DFB-Pokal and one UEFA Cup. Bayer also finished runner-up in the 2001–02 UEFA Champions League, falling 2–1 to Real Madrid in the final. Their local rivals are 1. FC Köln.

History

Origins and early years
On 27 November 1903, Wilhelm Hauschild wrote a letter – signed by 170 of his fellow workers – to his employer, the Friedrich Bayer and Co., seeking the company's support in starting a sports club. The company agreed to support the initiative, and on 1 July 1904 Turn- und Spielverein Bayer 04 Leverkusen was founded. On 31 May 1907, a separate football department was formed within the club. In the culture of sports in Germany at the time, there was significant animosity between gymnasts and other types of athletes. Eventually this contributed to a split within the club: on 8 June 1928, the footballers formed a separate association – Sportvereinigung Bayer 04 Leverkusen – that also included the handball and fistball players, athletics, and boxing, while the gymnasts carried on as TuS Bayer 04 Leverkusen. SV Bayer 04 Leverkusen took with them the club's traditional colours of red and black, with the gymnasts adopting blue and yellow.

Through this period, and into the 1930s, SV Bayer 04 Leverkusen played third and fourth division football. In 1936, they earned promotion to the second highest class of play of the period. That was also the year that the club wore the familiar "Bayer" cross for the first time. They made their first appearance in upper league play in 1951, in the Oberliga West and played there until 1956, after which they were relegated.

SV Bayer 04 Leverkusen would not return to the upper leagues until 1962, just one season before the formation of Germany's new professional league, the Bundesliga. The next year saw the club in the Regionalliga West, tier II, where their performances over the next few seasons left them well down the league table.

2. Bundesliga to Bundesliga, UEFA Cup, and DFB-Pokal
SV Bayer 04 Leverkusen made something of a breakthrough in 1968 by winning the division title, but was unable to advance through the playoff round to the first division. The club was relegated again in 1973, but made a quick return to what was now called the 2. Bundesliga after just one season spent in the third division. Four years later, the club handily secured a place in the Bundesliga to start to play there in the 1979–80 season.

By the mid-1980s, SV Bayer 04 Leverkusen had played its way into the upper half of the league table and was well-established there by the end of the decade. It was during this time, in 1984, that the two halves of the club that had parted ways over a half century earlier were re-united as TSV Bayer 04 Leverkusen e.V. The new club took red and white as its colours.

In addition to becoming an established Bundesliga side, the club earned its first honours with a dramatic win in the 1988 UEFA Cup. Down 0–3 to Espanyol after the first leg of the final, Bayer Leverkusen drew even in the return match and then captured the title on penalty kicks, 3–2.

That same year, long-time Bayer Leverkusen executive Reiner Calmund became the general manager of the club. This is regarded as one of the most important moves in the club's history, as Calmund ushered in a decade and a half of the club's greatest successes through shrewd, far-sighted player acquisitions.

After the German reunification in 1990, Reiner Calmund was quick to sign East German stars Ulf Kirsten, Andreas Thom and Jens Melzig. The three players would become instant crowd favourites, and make significant contributions to the team. Calmund also established groundbreaking contacts in Brazilian football, befriending Juan Figer, one of Brazil's most powerful player agents. Over the next few years, budding superstars, such as Jorginho and Paulo Sérgio, joined the team, as did Czech star Pavel Hapal. The club also signed charismatic players, such as Bernd Schuster, and Rudi Völler, helping to ensure the team's popularity and growing success.

The club captured its next honour in 1993 with a 1–0 win in the DFB-Pokal over a surprising Hertha BSC amateur squad on 12 June 1993. In the following season, in a game also known for its 45 m "German Goal of the Year" by Schuster (a goal which was later also named "Goal of the Decade"), Bayer played Eintracht Frankfurt early in the season, and, as both a "tip of the hat" to its own history as well as an attempt to perhaps upset the Frankfurt team, Bayer played in its new third colours, which were old-fashioned red and black stripes, similar jerseys to those Frankfurt generally wore at the time. This proved so popular with the fans that, very shortly thereafter, the team reverted to its "retro" colours of red and black, colours used on all home jerseys ever since.

After a near disaster in 1996 when the club faced a relegation battle, Bayer Leverkusen established itself as a powerful side, offering a technically pleasing offensive style of play under new coach Christoph Daum, who was also helped by the signing of players such as Lúcio, Emerson, Zé Roberto and Michael Ballack. Daum was later to be famously fired for a cocaine scandal that also cost him his ascent to the role of the Germany national team coach.

The Nearly Men

The team earned a series of four-second-place finishes from 1997 to 2002. The finishes of 2000 and 2002 were heart-breaking for supporters as on both occasions the team had the Bundesliga title within its grasp. In 2000, Bayer Leverkusen needed only a draw against SpVgg Unterhaching to win the title, but an own goal by Michael Ballack helped send the team to a crushing 2–0 defeat, while Bayern Munich clinched the title with a 3–1 victory over Werder Bremen. Two years later, the club surrendered a five-point lead atop the league table by losing two of its last three matches while Borussia Dortmund swept ahead with three consecutive victories in its final matches. The 2002 season has been dubbed the "Treble Horror", as Bayer Leverkusen were also beaten 4–2 in the DFB-Pokal final by Schalke 04 and lost the UEFA Champions League final 2–1 to Real Madrid, which also led to some of the English-language media dubbing them "Neverkusen". Leverkusen was the first team to reach the final of the Champions League without ever having won a national championship. In addition, five members of the Bayer Leverkusen team were also members of the Germany national team who lost in the final of the World Cup in the same year.

Recent years

The club went through startling reversals of fortune in the next two seasons. In the 2002 off-season, the team lost influential midfield stars Michael Ballack and Zé Roberto to archrivals Bayern Munich. The team then flirted with relegation through most of the 2002–03 season, leading to the firing of Klaus Toppmöller, who had coached the team during its most successful year, and he was replaced by the inexperienced Thomas Hörster. Charismatic coach Klaus Augenthaler took up the reins in the last two games of the season and helped avoid disaster with a win over his previous club, 1. FC Nürnberg. He then led Bayer Leverkusen to a third-place finish and a Champions League place the following year.

That following season's run in the Champions League saw the club get some measure of revenge on Real Madrid, opening its group stage campaign with a 3–0 rout of the Spanish giants, helping Leverkusen to win the group. Leverkusen, however, was defeated in the first knockout round by eventual champions Liverpool. The club finished sixth during the 2004–05 season to qualify for the next season's UEFA Cup.

Early in 2005, Augenthaler was fired as manager after the club got off to its worst Bundesliga start in over 20 years, with only one win in its first four league matches and a 0–1 home loss to CSKA Sofia in the first leg of its UEFA Cup match-up. Former Germany national team manager Rudi Völler, who had been named sporting director prior to the season, took charge of five matches as caretaker manager. Michael Skibbe, who was Völler's assistant coach with the national team, was named as his successor in October 2005. Skibbe turned Leverkusen's season around and guided the club to a sixth-place finish in 2006, earning another UEFA Cup place, and then repeated that feat with a fifth place Bundesliga finish in 2007.

The 2007–08 season was not a successful one for Leverkusen despite a good start to the season; five out of the last ten league matches were lost to clubs in the lower half of the table. Michael Skibbe was heavily criticised towards the end of the season after he continuously changed his starting line up. Bayer Leverkusen also lost a lot of its support towards the end of the season: in the 1–2 home loss against Hertha BSC, the Leverkusen fans caused much commotion, with fans chanting for the sacking of Skibbe, while some Ultras, who had seen enough, set fire to their jerseys and threw them onto the field. Michael Skibbe was sacked soon thereafter, leaving the club on 21 May 2008, with club officials stating that his departure was due to the failure to qualify for the following season's UEFA Cup group stage.

The 2008–09 season got off to a great start for Bayer Leverkusen under new manager Bruno Labbadia, who the club had acquired from 2. Bundesliga club SpVgg Greuther Fürth. As the season progressed, however, the team failed to achieve any wins against top clubs in the Bundesliga. Leverkusen did manage to reach the DFB-Pokal final on 30 May 2009 in Berlin, but fell 0–1 to Werder Bremen. Leverkusen finished the season in ninth place in the Bundesliga table and Labbadia moved to Hamburger SV in June 2009. Shortly thereafter, Leverkusen presented Jupp Heynckes as its new manager, who had previously managed Bayern Munich after Jürgen Klinsmann's departure. In the 2010–11 season, Bayer Leverkusen finished runner-up thus qualifying for the Champions League for the first time since 2005. However, Heynckes decided not to extend his contract and left Bayer Leverkusen in the 2011 close season to take over at Bayern Munich for a third time. In the 2012–13 and 2015–16 seasons, Leverkusen finished third with coach Sami Hyypiä and Roger Schmidt respectively, but were knocked out in the round of 16 of the Champions League the following season both times. In the 2019–20 UEFA Europa League, Leverkusen reached the quarter-finals for the first time since 2008, but were ultimately knocked out by Inter Milan in a 2–1 loss.

Club culture

In contrast to many other German football clubs, which hold close ties to their working-class roots, Bayer Leverkusen strives for a clean, family-friendly image. The BayArena has the reputation of being one of the most family-friendly football stadiums in Germany. Ironically, Bayer 04 was the first Bundesliga club whose fans identified themselves as Ultras and the city of Leverkusen is one of the old industrial cities of Germany.

Bayer Leverkusen is perceived by some to have an ongoing image problem of a different sort. Although they are a financially healthy club with a stable of strong players, many fans of the traditional clubs denounce Bayer Leverkusen as being a "plastic club" without traditions or a committed fan base, existing solely as a creation of their rich pharmaceutical company sponsor – Bayer AG. As a result, the club and their fans have started to emphasize their industrial origins with pride, calling themselves "Werkself" (Eng. "Factory team", "Millhanders") or "Pillendreher" (Eng. "Tablet twisters").

Bayer Leverkusen's corporate origins, however, are far from unique. Other clubs, including PSV, Carl Zeiss Jena and Sochaux, share a similar reputation of being works teams. As distinguished from the various Red Bull teams (Salzburg, New York and Leipzig) which has been established or redefined in the recent past primarily for commercial reasons, the formation of Bayer Leverkusen was motivated by the idea of promoting the living conditions of local factory workers early in the 20th century. In view of this tradition, UEFA allows Bayer Leverkusen to use the brand name Bayer in European club competitions while disallowing such naming practices most notably to Red Bull Salzburg.

Charity
In March 2020, Bayer Leverkusen, Borussia Dortmund, Bayern Munich, and RB Leipzig, the four German UEFA Champions League teams for the 2019–20 season, collectively gave €20 million to Bundesliga and 2. Bundesliga teams that were struggling financially during the COVID-19 pandemic.

Honours

Domestic

League 
Bundesliga
Runners-up: 1996–97, 1998–99, 1999–2000, 2001–02, 2010–11
2. Bundesliga North
Winners: 1978–79

Cup
DFB-Pokal
Winners: 1992–93
Runners-up: 2001–02, 2008–09, 2019–20
DFB-Supercup
Runners-up: 1993

European
UEFA Cup
Winners: 1987–88
UEFA Champions League
Runners-up: 2001–02

Youth
 German Under 19 championship
 Champions: 1986, 2000, 2007
 Runners-up: 1995, 2001, 2003, 2010
 German Under 17 championship
 Champions: 1992, 2016
Under 19 Bundesliga West
 Champions: 2007, 2010

In Europe
As of 30 June 2022.

Players

Squad

Players out on loan

Past players

Records

Coaching staff

Coaching history

Women's section

See also
 KFC Uerdingen 05
 Works team
 The Football Club Social Alliance

References

External links

 
Bayer 04 Leverkusen at UEFA
Leverkusen statistics
Bayer Leverkusen formations at football-lineups

 
Football clubs in Germany
Association football clubs established in 1904
Football clubs in North Rhine-Westphalia
G-14 clubs
Multi-sport clubs in Germany
1904 establishments in Germany
UEFA Cup winning clubs
Bayer
Works association football clubs in Germany
Bundesliga clubs
Leverkusen
2. Bundesliga clubs